St. John's Church, Peshawar, Pakistan, is the oldest in that city, constructed between 1851 and 1860. It is now called the Cathedral Church of St John, which is located in the cantonment next to the Peshawar Club. It is part of the Anglican Diocese of Peshawar, now part of the Church of Pakistan.

It was formerly a garrison church where the British families of the soldiers stationed in the North West Frontier congregated. The bodies of some British officers who were killed in action while fighting on the frontier, including that of Lieutenant Colonel James O'Bryen, were buried here.

References

Churches in Peshawar
Church of Pakistan church buildings in Pakistan